The Central Asian northern desert is an ecoregion in the deserts and xeric shrublands biome, located in the Central Asian countries of Kazakhstan and Uzbekistan. There are a range of habitat types including salt flats, clay desert, rocky desert and some sand desert. The vegetation consists of scanty xeric shrubs including Artemisia and Salsola. The fauna is varied, as well as mammals and birds, there are a large number of reptiles and many species of invertebrate. Some protected areas are included in this ecoregion but other parts are being degraded by conversion to farmland, overgrazing and poaching.

Setting
The Central Asian northern desert occupies southern Kazakhstan and most of Uzbekistan. The topography of this ecoregion is varied, featuring salty "solonchak" deserts with a great number of salt flats, clay deserts, rocky deserts, and a small area of sandy desert in the southern portion of the region.

Flora
The vegetation of this ecoregion is dominated by shrubs and semi-shrubs, with a variety of different species adapted to the different soil types found in it. Clay deserts support communities of Anabasis salsa, Salsola orientalis, and the Artemisia species A. terrae albae, A. turanica, and A. gurganica. The stony deserts support mainly Salsola arbusculae formis and Nanophyton erinaceum, while the "solonchaks" support the semi-shrubs Ceratoides papposa, Artemisia terrae albae''', var. massagetovii, A. santolina, and A. songarica, shrubs such as Calligonum aphyllum, Ephedra lomatolepis as well as grasses such as Agropyron fragile.

Fauna
Mammals of the Central Asian northern desert include the long-eared hedgehog (Hemiechinus auritus), tolai hare (lepus tolai), various species of gerbil and jerboa, saiga antelope (Saiga tatarica), steppe polecat (Mustela eversmanni), goitered gazelle (Gazella subgutturosa ), onager (Equus hemonius) and suslik (Spermophilus spp.).

Birds of this ecoregion include wheatears (Oenanthe isabellina, O. deserti), desert warbler (Sylvia nana), brown-necked raven (Corvus ruficollis), the endangered houbara bustard (Chlamydotis undulata), black-bellied sandgrouse (Pterocles orientalis), golden eagle (Aquila chrysaetos), steppe eagle (Aquila rapax), Egyptian vulture (Neophron percnopterus), and the saker falcon (Falco cherrug).

Numerous reptiles can be found in this ecoregion, including numerous Agama lizards, Rustamov's skink gekko (Teratoscincus scincus rustamovi), Chernov's snake-lizard (Ophimorus chernovi), Ferghana sand lizard (Eremias scripta pherganensis), desert monitor (Varanus griseus) and the Central Asian cobra (Naja oxiana'').

The invertebrate fauna of this ecoregion is quite rich, especially in the sandy deserts, supporting a variety of grasshoppers, beetles, butterflies, termites and ants.

Conservation status and threats
The conservation status of this ecoregion is listed as "vulnerable", and the main threats to its integrity are conversion of habitat to farmland, over-hunting and poaching and the use of plants for firewood and silk production. Protected areas include the Barsa-Kelmes Nature Reserve on an island in the Aral Sea, the Kaplankyr reserve, the Ustyurt reserve, and the Altyn-Emel National Park in Kazakhstan.

References

Deserts of Central Asia
Deserts of Kazakhstan
Deserts of Uzbekistan
Deserts and xeric shrublands
Ecoregions of Kazakhstan
Ecoregions of Uzbekistan
Ecoregions of Asia

Palearctic ecoregions
Ecoregions of Kyrgyzstan